This is a list of states in the Holy Roman Empire beginning with the letter T:

References

T